Saphenista pululahuana is a species of moth of the family Tortricidae. It is found in Ecuador (Pichincha Province) and Peru.

The wingspan is about 21.5 mm. The ground colour of the forewings is brownish cream, suffused with brown in the dorsal and basal areas. The hindwings are brownish cream.

Etymology
The species name refers to Pululahua volcano, the type locality.

References

Moths described in 2008
Saphenista